A lightning strike or lightning bolt is an electric discharge between the atmosphere and the ground. Most originate in a cumulonimbus cloud and terminate on the ground, called cloud-to-ground (CG) lightning. A less common type of strike, ground-to-cloud (GC) lightning, is upward-propagating lightning initiated from a tall grounded object and reaching into the clouds. About 25% of all lightning events worldwide are strikes between the atmosphere and earth-bound objects. Most are intracloud (IC) lightning and cloud-to-cloud (CC), where discharges only occur high in the atmosphere. Lightning strikes the average commercial aircraft at least once a year, but modern engineering and design means this is rarely a problem. The movement of aircraft through clouds can even cause lightning strikes.

A single lightning event is a "flash", which is a complex, multistage process, some parts of which are not fully understood. Most CG flashes only "strike" one physical location, referred to as a "termination". The primary conducting channel, the bright, coursing light that may be seen and is called a "strike", is only about one inch in diameter, but because of its extreme brilliance, it often looks much larger to the human eye and in photographs. Lightning discharges are typically miles long, but certain types of horizontal discharges can be tens of miles in length. The entire flash lasts only a fraction of a second.

Strikes 

Lightning strikes can injure humans in several different ways:
 Direct
 Direct strike – the person is part of a flash channel. Enormous quantities of energy pass through the body very quickly, resulting in internal burns, organ damage, explosions of flesh and bone, and nervous system damage. Depending on the flash strength and access to medical services, it may be instantaneously fatal or cause permanent injury and impairment. 
 Contact injury – an object (generally a conductor) that a person is touching is electrified by a strike.
 Side splash – branches of currents "jumping" from the primary flash channel, electrify the person. 
 Blast injuries – being thrown and suffering blunt-force trauma from the shock wave (if very close) and possible hearing damage from the thunder.
 Indirect
 Ground current or "step potential" – Earth surface charges race towards the flash channel during discharge. Because the ground has high impedance, the current "chooses" a better conductor, often a person's legs, passing through the body. The near-instantaneous rate of discharge causes a potential (difference) over distance, which may amount to several thousand volts per linear foot. This phenomenon (also responsible for reports of mass reindeer deaths due to lightning storms) leads to more injuries and deaths than the above three combined.
 EMPs – the discharge process produces an electromagnetic pulse (EMP), which may damage an artificial pacemaker, or otherwise affect normal biological processes.
 Hallucinations may be induced in people located within 200 m (650 ft) of a severe lightning storm.
 Secondary or resultant
 Explosions
 Fires
 Accidents

Warning signs of an impending strike nearby can include a crackling sound, sensations of static electricity in the hair or skin, the pungent smell of ozone, or the appearance of a blue haze around persons or objects (St. Elmo's fire). People caught in such extreme situations – without having been able to flee to a safer, fully enclosed space – are advised to assume the "lightning position", which involves "sitting or crouching with knees and feet close together to create only one point of contact with the ground" (with the feet off the ground if sitting; if a standing position is needed, the feet must be touching).

Injuries 

Lightning strikes can produce severe injuries, and are lethal in between 10 and 30% of cases, with up to 80% of survivors sustaining long-term injuries. These severe injuries are not usually caused by thermal burns, since the current is too brief to greatly heat up tissues; instead, nerves and muscles may be directly damaged by the high voltage producing holes in their cell membranes, a process called electroporation.

In a direct strike, the electrical currents in the flash channel pass directly through the victim. The relatively high voltage drop around poorer electrical conductors (such as a human being), causes the surrounding air to ionize and break down, and the external flashover diverts most of the main discharge current so that it passes "around" the body, reducing injury.

Metallic objects in contact with the skin may "concentrate" the lightning's energy, given it is a better natural conductor and the preferred pathway, resulting in more serious injuries, such as burns from molten or evaporating metal. At least two cases have been reported where a strike victim wearing an iPod suffered more serious injuries as a result.

During a flash, though, the current flowing through the channel and around the body can generate large electromagnetic fields and EMPs, which may induce electrical transients (surges) within the nervous system or pacemaker of the heart, upsetting normal operations. This effect might explain cases where cardiac arrest or seizures followed a lightning strike that produced no external injuries. It may also point to the victim not being directly struck at all, but just being very close to the strike termination.

Another effect of lightning on bystanders is to their hearing. The resulting shock wave of thunder can damage the ears. Also, electrical interference to telephones or headphones may result in damaging acoustic noise.

Epidemiology

There are about 240,000 lightning strikes incidents around the world each year.

According to National Geographic, about 2,000 people are killed annually worldwide by lightning. If all eight billion humans have an equal chance of being killed over a 70-year lifespan, this gives a lifetime probability of about 1 in 60,000. However, due to increased awareness and improved lightning conductors and protection, the number of annual lightning deaths has been decreasing steadily year by year.

According to the National Oceanic and Atmospheric Administration, over the twenty years to 2012 the United States averaged 51 annual lightning strike fatalities, making it the second-most frequent cause of weather-related death after floods. In the US, between 9 and 10% of those struck die, with an annual average of 25 deaths in the 2010s decade (16 in 2017).

In the United States in the period 2009 to 2018 an average of 27 lightning fatalities occurred per year. In the United States an average of 23 people died from lightning per year from 2012 to 2021. It was also reported that some people  receive lifelong brain injuries.

In Kisii in western Kenya, some 30 people die each year from lightning strikes. Kisii's high rate of lightning fatalities occurs because of the frequency of thunderstorms and because many of the area's structures have metal roofs.

These statistics do not reflect the difference between direct strikes, where the victim was part of the lightning pathway, indirect effects of being close to the termination point, such as ground currents, and resultant, where the casualty arose from subsequent events, such as fires or explosions. Even the most knowledgeable first responders may not recognize a lightning-related injury, let alone particulars, which a medical examiner, police investigator, or on the rare occasion a trained lightning expert may have difficulty identifying to record accurately. 

Direct-strike casualties could be much higher than reported numbers.

It has been reported that "30-60 people are struck by lightning each year in Britain, and on average, 3 (5-10%) of these strikes are fatal."

In 2015 it was reported that between five and ten deaths from lightning occur in Australia every year with over 100 injuries occurring.

It has been reported that "A direct strike accounts for only 3 to 5 per cent of all injuries and death, while ground currents, which spread out over the ground after lightning strikes, account for up to 50 per cent... ...Where the lightning strikes the ground, the ground becomes highly electrified and if you're within that area of ground electrification..." you can receive an electrical shock from the lightning.

It was estimated that "...one in four people struck by lightning are sheltering under trees."

Effect on nature

Impact on vegetation

Trees are frequent conductors of lightning to the ground. Since sap is a relatively poor conductor, its electrical resistance causes it to be heated explosively into steam, which blows off the bark outside the lightning's path. In following seasons, trees overgrow the damaged area and may cover it completely, leaving only a vertical scar. If the damage is severe, the tree may not be able to recover, and decay sets in, eventually killing the tree.

In sparsely populated areas such as the Russian Far East and Siberia, lightning strikes are one of the major causes of forest fires. The smoke and mist expelled by a very large forest fire can cause electric charges, starting additional fires many kilometers downwind.

Shattering of rocks

When water in fractured rock is rapidly heated by a lightning strike, the resulting steam explosion can cause rock disintegration and shift boulders. It may be a significant factor in erosion of tropical and subtropical mountains that have never been glaciated. Evidence of lightning strikes includes erratic magnetic fields.

Electrical and structural damage 

Telephones, modems, computers, and other electronic devices can be damaged by lightning, as harmful overcurrent can reach them through the phone jack, Ethernet cable, or electricity outlet. Close strikes can also generate EMPs, especially during "positive" lightning discharges.

Lightning currents have a very fast rise time, on the order of 40 kA per microsecond. Hence, conductors of such currents exhibit marked skin effect, causing most of the currents to flow through the outer surface of the conductor.

In addition to electrical wiring damage, the other types of possible damage to consider include structural, fire, and property damage.

Prevention and mitigations
The field of lightning-protection systems is an enormous industry worldwide due to the impacts lightning can have on the constructs and activities of humankind. Lightning, as varied in properties measured across orders of magnitude as it is, can cause direct effects or have secondary impacts; lead to the complete destruction of a facility or process or simply cause the failure of a remote electronic sensor; it can result in outdoor activities being halted for safety concerns to employees as a thunderstorm nears an area and until it has sufficiently passed; it can ignite volatile commodities stored in large quantities or interfere with the normal operation of a piece of equipment at critical periods of time.

Most lightning-protection devices and systems protect physical structures on the earth, aircraft in flight being the notable exception. While some attention has been paid to attempting to control lightning in the atmosphere, all attempts proved extremely limited in success. Chaff and silver iodide crystal concepts were devised to deal directly with the cloud cells, and were dispensed directly into the clouds from an overflying aircraft. The chaff was devised to deal with the electrical manifestations of the storm from within, while the silver iodide salting technique was devised to deal with the mechanical forces of the storm.

Lightning protection systems 

Hundreds of devices, including lightning rods and charge transfer systems, are used to mitigate lightning damage and influence the path of a lightning flash.

A lightning rod (or lightning protector) is a metal strip or rod connected to earth through conductors and a grounding system, used to provide a preferred pathway to ground if lightning terminates on a structure. The class of these products is often called a "finial" or "air terminal". A lightning rod or "Franklin rod" in honor of its famous inventor, Benjamin Franklin, is simply a metal rod, and without being connected to the lightning protection system, as was sometimes the case in the past, will provide no added protection to a structure. Other names include "lightning conductor", "arrester", and "discharger"; however, over the years these names have been incorporated into other products or industries with a stake in lightning protection. Lightning arrester, for example, often refers to fused links that explode when a strike occurs to a high-voltage overhead power line to protect the more expensive transformers down the line by opening the circuit. In reality, it was an early form of a heavy duty surge-protection device. Modern arresters, constructed with metal oxides, are capable of safely shunting abnormally high voltage surges to ground while preventing normal system voltages from being shorted to ground.

In 1962, the USAF placed protective lightning strike-diversion tower arrays at all of the Italian and Turkish Jupiter MRBM nuclear armed missiles sites after two strikes partially arming the missiles.

Monitoring and warning systems 

The exact location of a lightning strike and when it will occur are still impossible to predict. However, products and systems have been designed of varying complexities to alert people as the probability of a strike increases above a set level determined by a risk assessment for the location's conditions and circumstances. One significant improvement has been in the area of detection of flashes through both ground- and satellite-based observation devices. The strikes and atmospheric flashes are not predicted, but the level of detail recorded by these technologies has vastly improved in the past 20 years.

Although commonly associated with thunderstorms at close range, lightning strikes can occur on a day that seems devoid of clouds. This occurrence is known as "a bolt from the blue [sky]"; lightning can strike up to 10 miles from a cloud.

Lightning interferes with amplitude modulation (AM) radio signals much more than frequency modulation (FM) signals, providing an easy way to gauge local lightning strike intensity. To do so, one should tune a standard AM medium wave receiver to a frequency with no transmitting stations, and listen for crackles among the static. Stronger or nearby lightning strikes will also cause cracking if the receiver is tuned to a station. As lower frequencies propagate further along the ground than higher ones, the lower medium wave (MW) band frequencies (in the 500–600 kHz range) can detect lightning strikes at longer distances; if the longwave band (153–279 kHz) is available, using it can increase this range even further.

Lightning-detection systems have been developed and may be deployed in locations where lightning strikes present special risks, such as public parks. Such systems are designed to detect the conditions which are believed to favor lightning strikes and provide a warning to those in the vicinity to allow them to take appropriate cover.

Personal safety 

The U.S. National Lightning Safety Institute advises American citizens to have a plan for their safety when a thunderstorm occurs and to commence it as soon as the first lightning is seen or thunder heard. This is important, as lightning can strike without rain actually falling. If thunder can be heard at all, then a risk of lightning exists.

The National Lightning Safety Institute also recommends using the F-B (flash to boom) method to gauge distance to a lightning strike. The flash of a lightning strike and resulting thunder occur at roughly the same time. But light travels 300,000 km/sec, almost a million times the speed of sound. Sound travels at the slower speed of about 340 m/sec (depending on the temperature), so the flash of lightning is seen before thunder is heard. A method to determine the distance between lightning strike and viewer involves counting the seconds between the lightning flash and thunder. Then, dividing by three to determine the distance in kilometers, or by five for miles. Immediate precautions against lightning should be taken if the F-B time is 25 seconds or less, that is, if the lightning is closer than 8 km or 5 miles.

A report suggested that whether a person was standing up, squatting, or lying down when outside during a thunderstorm does not matter, because lightning can travel along the ground; this report suggested  being inside a solid structure or vehicle was safest.

The riskiest activities include fishing, boating, camping, and golf. A person injured by lightning does not carry an electrical charge, and can be safely handled to apply first aid before emergency services arrive. Lightning can affect the brainstem, which controls breathing.

Several studies conducted in South Asia and Africa suggest that the dangers of lightning are not taken sufficiently seriously there. A research team from the University of Colombo found that even in neighborhoods that had experienced deaths from lightning, no precautions were taken against future storms. An expert forum convened in 2007 to address how to raise awareness of lightning and improve lightning-protection standards, and expressed concern that many countries had no official standards for the installation of lightning rods.

Safety measures

 Do not be next to a high object such as a tree or near metal objects like poles and fences.
 Do not take shelter in car ports, open garages, covered patios, picnic shelters, beach pavilions, tents, sheds, greenhouses, golf shelters and baseball dugouts.
 Take shelter in a building or a vehicle. It was reported that "The steel frame of a hard topped vehicle can protect you from lightning..." and to "avoid using electronic equipment inside the car and avoid touching anything metal."
 If inside a building, avoid electrical equipment and plumbing including taking a shower.
 Risk remains for up to 30 minutes after the last observed lightning or thunder.
 It has been reported that "If you are on water, get to the shore and off wide, open beaches as quickly as possible as water will transmit strikes from further away. Studies have shown that proximity to water is a common factor in lightning strikes."
 It has been reported that "If you do not have anywhere to go, then you should make for the lowest possible ground like a valley or ravine."
 Do not huddle up "...with other people in a group — spread out from your friends as much as you can."
 If your hair stands on end, lightning is about to strike you or in your vicinity. Get indoors as fast as possible. If not, drop to your knees and bend forward but don't lie flat on the ground. You may also feel a tingling sensation of static electricity on your skin.

Notable incidents 

All events associated or suspected of causing damage are called "lightning incidents" due to four important factors.
 Forensic evidence of a lightning termination, in the best investigated examples, are minuscule (a pit in metal smaller than a pen point) or inconclusive (dark coloration).
 The object struck may explode or subsequent fires destroy all of the little evidence that may have been available immediately after the strike itself.
 The flash channel and discharge itself are not the only causes of injury, ignition, or damages, i.e., ground currents or explosions of flammables.
 Human sensory acuity is not as fine as that of the milliseconds in duration of a lightning flash, and people's ability to observe this event is subject to the brain's inability to comprehend it. Lightning-detection systems are coming online, both satellite and land-based, but their accuracy is still measured in the hundreds to thousands of feet, rarely allowing them to pinpoint the exact location of the termination.
 
As such it is often inconclusive, albeit highly probable a lightning flash was involved, hence categorizing it as a "lightning incident" covers all bases.

Earth-bound 

 1660s: In 1660, lightning ignited the gunpowder magazine at Osaka Castle, Japan; the resultant explosion set the castle on fire. In 1665, lightning again terminated on the main tower of the castle, igniting a fire, which subsequently burned it to its foundation.
 1769: A particularly deadly lightning incident occurred in Brescia, Italy. Lightning struck the Church of St. Nazaire, igniting the 90 tonnes of gunpowder in its vaults; the resulting explosion killed 3,000 people and destroyed a sixth of the city.
 1901: 11 killed and one was paralyzed below the hips by a strike in Chicago.
 1902: A lightning strike damaged the upper section of the Eiffel Tower, requiring the reconstruction of its top.
 1970 July 12: The central mast of the Orlunda radio transmitter in central Sweden collapsed after a lightning strike destroyed its foundation insulator.
 1980 June 30: A lightning incident killed 11 pupils in Biego primary school in Kenya in present-day Nyamira County. Another 50 pupils were injured, while others were left traumatized.
 1994 November 2: A lightning incident led to the explosion of fuel tanks in Durunka, Egypt, causing 469 fatalities.
 2005 October 31: Sixty-eight dairy cows died on a farm at Fernbrook on the Waterfall Way near Dorrigo, New South Wales, after being involved in a lightning incident. Three others were temporarily paralyzed for several hours, later making a full recovery. The cows were sheltering near a tree when it was struck by lightning. Soil resistivity is generally higher than that of animal tissue. When immense amounts of energy are released into the soil, just the few meters up an animal's leg, through its body and down other legs can present a markedly reduced resistance to electrical current and a proportionally higher amount will flow through the animal than the soil on which it is standing. This phenomenon, called ground-potential rise, can cause significant and damaging electrical shock, enough to kill large animals.
 2007 July: A lightning incident killed up to 30 people when it struck Ushari Dara, a remote mountain village in northwestern Pakistan.
 2011 June 8: A lightning strike sent 77 Air Force cadets to the hospital when it struck in the middle of a training camp at Camp Shelby, Mississippi.
 2013 February: Nine South African children were hospitalized after a lightning incident occurred on a cricket field at their school, injuring five children on the pitch and four girls who were walking home.
 2016 May–June: Rock am Ring festival near Frankfurt was cancelled after at least 80 people were injured due to lightning in the area. Additionally, 11 children in France and three adults in Germany were injured and one man killed in southern Poland around the same dates.
 2016 August 26: A herd of wild reindeer was struck on the Hardangervidda in central Norway, killing 323. Norwegian Environment Agency spokesman Kjartan Knutsen said it had never heard of such a death toll before. He said he did not know if multiple strikes occurred, but that they all died in "one moment".
 2017: The first live recording of a lightning strike on a cardiac rhythm strip occurred in a teenaged male who had an implanted loop recorder as a cardiac monitor for neurocardiogenic syncope.
2018: A lightning strike killed at least 16 people and injured dozens more at a Seventh-Day Adventist church in Rwanda.
2021: A lightning strike killed a 9-year-old boy in a field in Blackpool, England.
2021: In April, at least 76 people across India were killed by lightning strike on a single weekend; 23 people died on the watchtower of Amer Fort, a popular tourist spot in Rajasthan, and 42 were killed in  Uttar Pradesh with the highest toll of 14 happening in the city of Allahabad. Lastly, 11 were killed in Madhya Pradesh with two of them killed while sheltering under trees when they were tending sheep.
2021: On August 4, 17 people were killed by a single lightning strike in Shibganj Upazila of Chapainawabganj district in Bangladesh; 16 people died on the spot and the other one died by heart attack while seeing the others.
2022: On August 4, 3 people were killed and another person was injured after lightning struck a tree in Lafayette Square, Washington, D.C.
2022: On August 5, lightning struck a fuel tank at an oil storage facility in Matanzas, causing a fire and a series of explosions that resulted in at least one death and up to 125 injuries. In addition, 17 firefighters were reported missing.
2022: On August 18, a woman was killed and two people hospitalized after lightning struck a tree in Winter Springs, Florida.

In-flight 
Airplanes are commonly struck by lightning without damage, with the typical commercial aircraft hit at least once a year. Sometimes, though, the effects of a strike are serious. 
 1963 December 8: Pan Am Flight 214 crashed outside Elkton, Maryland, during a severe electrical storm, with a loss of all 81 passengers and crew. The Boeing 707-121, registered as N709PA, was on the final leg of a San Juan–Baltimore–Philadelphia flight.
 1969 November 14: The Apollo 12 mission's Saturn V rocket and its ionized exhaust plume became part of a lightning flash channel 36.5 seconds after lift-off. Although the discharge occurred "through" the metal skin and framework of the vehicle, it did not ignite the rocket's highly combustible fuel.
 1971 December 24: LANSA Flight 508, a Lockheed L-188A Electra turboprop, registered OB-R-941, operated as a scheduled domestic passenger flight by Lineas Aéreas Nacionales Sociedad Anonima (LANSA), crashed after a lightning strike ignited a fuel tank while it was en route from Lima, Peru, to Pucallpa, Peru, killing 91 people – all of its 6 crew-members and 85 of its 86 passengers. The sole survivor was Juliane Koepcke, who fell  down into the Amazon rainforest strapped to her seat and remarkably survived the fall, and was then able to walk through the jungle for 10 days until she was rescued by local fishermen.
 2012 November 4: a plane was reported as exploding off the coast of Herne Bay, Kent, while in flight. This did not turn out to be the case; rather, the plane became part of the flash channel, causing observers to report the plane and surrounding sky appeared bright pink.
 2019 May 5: Aeroflot Flight 1492, a Sukhoi Superjet 100, was, according to the flight captain, struck by lightning on take-off, damaging electrical systems and forcing the pilots to attempt an emergency landing. The plane hit the ground hard and caught on fire, which engulfed the plane on the runway. Of the 78 people on board, 41 were killed.

Most-stricken human 

 Roy Sullivan holds a Guinness World Record after surviving seven different lightning strikes. He had multiple injuries across his body.

Longest lightning bolt 
A 2020 lightning bolt across the southern United States set the record for the longest lightning bolt ever detected. The bolt stretched for 477 miles (768 kilometers) over Mississippi, Louisiana, and Texas, although it was between clouds and did not strike the ground. The World Meteorological Organization confirmed its record-breaking status in January 2022.

See also 
 Fulgurites are a CG lightning discharge event that can produce "petrified lightning", demonstrating the enormous, albeit brief, amount of energy transferred by lightning column. They can visually demonstrate how energy may internally or externally diffuse from one or several central nodes of the termination, and differences between the diameters of these channels, which range from only a few mm to several cm. The possible range of forms and compositions of fulgurites vary dramatically, reflecting the complex electrical, chemical, and physical properties of a target sediment, rock, or biological mass. 
 Geomagnetically induced currents  are phenomena related to space radiation, causing transients and electrical irregularities that impact electrical and data-transmission systems on a broad scale. Flash EMPs and ground currents operate in the same manner, but they are more frequent and have much more localized effects on technology.
 Keraunopathy is the medical study of lightning casualties and associated treatment.

References

External links 
 When lightning strikes people -NASA
 Lightning Safety Page – National Weather Service Pueblo Colorado 
 Video footage - A Beech tree (Fagus sylvatica) that has been hit by lightning.

Lightning

ay:Lliju lliju